School's Out is the fifth studio album by American rock band Alice Cooper, released in 1972.  Following on from the success of Killer, School's Out reached No. 2 on the US Billboard 200 chart and No. 1 on the Canadian RPM 100 Top Albums chart, holding the top position for four weeks. The single "School's Out" reached No. 7 on the Billboard Hot 100, No. 3 on the Canadian RPM Top Singles Chart and went to No. 1 in the UK Singles Chart.

Packaging 
The original album cover (designed by Craig Braun) had the sleeve opening in the manner of a wooden school desk, similar to Thinks: School Stinks, by Hotlegs, released two years earlier. The vinyl record inside was wrapped in a pair of panties, though this was later discontinued as the paper panties were found to be flammable. The desk photographed for the album cover is on display in the Hard Rock Cafe in Las Vegas.

Reception

Ian Chapman has put forward a theory that it was a concept album about youth lost when leaving school.

Live performances
Although the title track remains the most-performed song in Alice Cooper’s live shows, in accordance with the conceptual nature of School’s Out, the album has overall a smaller representation in his live setlist than Love It to Death, Killer, Billion Dollar Babies, or Welcome to My Nightmare, accounting for only 6.8 percent of the songs Cooper has played live. “Gutter Cat Vs. The Jets” and “Public Animal #9” were the only other School’s Out songs played on the supporting School’s Out For Summer ‘72 tour, but neither became a permanent part of setlist and “Gutter Cat” was last performed in 2004 on the Eyes of Alice Cooper tour. Short instrumental “Street Fight” was never performed until the 1980 Flush the Fashion tour, and was last played on the School’s Out for Summer ‘97 tour, whilst “My Stars” was a regular part of setlists on the 1973-74 Billion Dollar Babies Tour but never played again until 2019 when it became a regular on the Ol' Black Eyes Is Back Tour. “Blue Turk”, “Alma Mater” and “Grand Finale” have never been performed live, and “Luney Tune” only once, during the Psychodrama Tour at Grand Canyon University on May 9, 2009 with Cooper tribute band Halo of Flies.

Track listing

Personnel 
Alice Cooper band
 Alice Cooper – vocals
 Glen Buxton – lead guitar
 Michael Bruce – rhythm guitar, keyboards, backing vocals
 Dennis Dunaway – bass guitar, backing vocals
 Neal Smith – drums, backing vocals

Additional musicians
 Bob Ezrin – keyboards
 Dick Wagner – guitar
 Wayne Andre – trombone on "Blue Turk"

Charts

Weekly charts

Year-end charts

Certifications

References 

Alice Cooper albums
1972 albums
Albums produced by Bob Ezrin
Albums recorded at Record Plant (New York City)
Concept albums
Warner Records albums